Geraldo Teixeira (born 5 May 1937), known as Aladim, is a Brazilian former footballer.

References

1937 births
Living people
Association football forwards
Brazilian footballers
Bangu Atlético Clube players
Footballers at the 1964 Summer Olympics
Olympic footballers of Brazil
People from Natal, Rio Grande do Norte
Sportspeople from Rio Grande do Norte